Holbrookia approximans, the speckled earless lizard, is a species of earless lizard  which is found in the Southwestern United States and northern Mexico. It is sometimes referred to as the western earless lizard.

Taxonomy
The speckled earless lizard has been elevated to full species status as Holbrookia approximans.

Description
The speckled earless lizard is an overall gray-brown in color, with black and white speckling all along its back, with a solid gray-brown underside. It has distinct black and white bars immediately preceding the hind legs. Males tend to have a blue coloration to the white bars, whereas females do not. Like all species of earless lizards, it has no external ear openings.

Behavior
Like all species of earless lizards, the speckled earless lizard is diurnal and insectivorous. It prefers sandy, grassland habitats with sparse vegetation. It tends to be a nervous, wary species that flees quickly if approached.

References

External links

Further reading
Baird SF (1858). "Description of New Genera and Species of North American Lizards in the Museum of the Smithsonian Institution". Proc. Acad. Nat. Sci. Philadelphia 10: 253–246. (Holbrookia approximans, new species, pp. 253–254).

Holbrookia
Fauna of the Southwestern United States
Reptiles of Mexico
Reptiles described in 1858